Hallie Flanagan Davis (August 27, 1889 in Redfield, South Dakota – June 23, 1969 in Old Tappan, New Jersey) was an American theatrical producer and director, playwright, and author, best known as director of the Federal Theatre Project, a part of the Works Progress Administration (WPA).

Background

Hallie Flanagan was born in Redfield, South Dakota. When she was around 10, her family moved to Grinnell, Iowa. She attended Grinnell College where she majored in Philosophy and German, and was an active member in the Literary and Dramatic Clubs. During her time at Grinnell she became friends with Harry Hopkins, who had also grown up in Grinnell and was a year behind her at Grinnell College. It was this connection that would be instrumental in her later position in the WPA Federal Theatre Project. She graduated from Grinnell in 1911. It was during college that she met her husband, Murray Flanagan, who was also a member of the Grinnell Dramatic Club. After college, the two exchanged vows, and had two sons, Jack and Frederick Flanagan. Murray was diagnosed with tuberculosis; the disease took his life in 1919. Soon after, in 1922, the elder son, Jack, died of spinal meningitis. Hallie and Frederick moved to Cambridge, Massachusetts where she enrolled in George Pierce Baker's famous 47 Workshop dramatic production studio at Radcliffe College/Harvard University. This class, one of the first of its kind at an American university, taught playwrighting. Baker was so impressed with her, he decided to make her the director of the workshop's actors' group in 1923. While at Radcliffe and later at Vassar College, Flanagan began developing her own ideas for experimental theatre.

Career

Vassar College

When Flanagan came to Vassar, there was no theater and all drama courses were taught in the English department. Flanagan's official title at the school was "Director of English Speech". In 1926, Flanagan became the first woman awarded a Guggenheim Fellowship to study theatre around Europe for 14 months. While there, she met some of the most influential figures in theatre including John Galsworthy, Konstantin Stanislavsky, Edward Gordon Craig and Lady Gregory. Flanagan especially shared a connection with the Russian theater, and later wrote a book, Shifting Scenes of the Modern European Theater (1928), based on her travels. After returning to Vassar, she began to institute many of her newly developed ideas with the Vassar Experimental Theatre, which she created. The first play she produced was Anton Chekhov's Marriage Proposal, using the original Chekhov style, an expressionistic style, and Meyerhold's constructivist techniques throughout the three acts. Over the years, she pushed the administration to start an independent major in drama, but it wasn't approved until after Flanagan had left. Flanagan rose to national prominence after producing the theatrical adaptation she co-wrote, Can You Hear Their Voices?, based on the short story written by Whittaker Chambers for The New Masses in 1931.

Federal Theatre Project

With the onset of the Great Depression, and masses of people (including the theatrically inclined) out of work, Franklin D. Roosevelt established the WPA to provide jobs for many of the unemployed. Among the many branches of this program was the Federal Theatre Project, which aimed to employ the jobless entertainers across America. In September 1935, WPA head Harry Hopkins, who knew Flanagan from Grinnell College and had read Flanagan's 1928 book, Shifting Scenes of the European Theatre, asked Flanagan to lead the Project.

Flanagan's vision for the Project was to bring cutting-edge, high-quality theatre to the great majority of the American public who had never witnessed it. The project paid salaries to struggling artists and  crafts workers, and spread well-crafted, affordable programs across the nation. The Project involved creating children's theatre as well as Living Newspaper plays, based on German director Erwin Piscator's concepts, that would reach out to the culturally unaware. Though the Project enabled the creation of a number of works, conservatives took issue with the apparent political agendas being delivered by the plays. Concerns over works with messages deemed to be communistic and socialistic plagued Flanagan and the Theatre Project. On these qualms, Flanagan states, "The basis of the choice of plays is that we have always believed in the Federal Theatre Project that any theater supported by the Federal funds should do no plays of a subversive, or cheap, or shoddy, or vulgar, or outworn, or imitative nature, but only such plays as the Government could stand behind in a program which is national in scope and regional in emphasis and democratic in American attitude." By 1936, Flanagan had hired 12,500 people across 28 states. In New York City alone, the Federal Theatre Project regularly played to weekly audiences of 350,000. Since the plays were federally funded, the Project could afford to sell tickets at drastically reduced prices, making the productions accessible and inclusive to a wider audience.

In 1938, Flanagan was called to testify before the House Un-American Activities Committee under suspicion of supporting a socialist agenda and subverting American values through her work at the Federal Theatre Project. After just four years, the Federal Theatre Project was shut down, and Flanagan returned to Vassar.

Smith College

In 1942, Flanagan accepted Smith College's offer to serve as Dean of the College, and as a professor in the Theater Department. She resigned from her position as Dean in 1946 so that she could focus on the Theater Department, of which she was the chair of the department. She also wrote and directed productions put on at the college and director of productions put on at the college. She retired from Smith in 1955. 

In 1962, the Studio Theater in Smith's new Center for the Performing Arts was named in her honor.

Other details

Flanagan's first husband, Murray Flanagan, died in 1918 from tuberculosis, they had two sons. In 1934, she married Philip Davis, a professor of Greek at Vassar.

In Tim Robbins' Cradle Will Rock (1999), Cherry Jones played Hallie Flanagan.

She is also a minor character in the novel The Group, by Vassar grad Mary McCarthy, being mentioned in the first chapter and appearing briefly in the last chapter.

Flanagan went on leave from Smith in 1953 and officially retired to Poughkeepsie in 1955. She was recognized many times for her contributions to modern theater, including an honorary degree from Williams College in 1941 and the first National Theater Conference Citation award in 1968. Flanagan spent the last few years of her life in nursing homes and died on July 23, 1969 in Old Tappan, N.J.

See also
 Can You Hear Their Voices?
 Living Newspaper
 Vassar College
 Federal Theatre Project
 Works Progress Administration

References

Further reading
 Bentley, Joanne. Hallie Flanagan: A Life in the American Theatre (Alfred A. Knopf, 1988). online
 Mathews, Jane DeHart. Federal Theatre, 1935-1939: Plays, Relief, and Politics (Princeton UP 1967) online
Moore, Angela Kristine. "Democratizing cultural production: a theory cultivated with Hallie Flanagan Davis." (PhD dissertation, Texas Christian University 2018) online.
 Osborne, Elizabeth A. "A Democratic Legacy: Hallie Flanagan and the Vassar Experimental Theatre." in Women, Collective Creation, and Devised Performance (Palgrave Macmillan, 2016) pp. 67–80.
 Walker, Suzanne. "'Now I Know Love': Hallie Flanagan and Euripides' 'Hippolytus.'" Classical World (2014): 97-116. online
 Williams, Kristin S., and Albert J. Mills. "Hallie Flanagan and the federal theater project: a critical undoing of management history." Journal of Management History (2018). online

Primary sources
 Flanagan, Hallie. Arena: The Story of the Federal Theatre (1940) online 1985 edition
 Flanagan, Hallie. "A Brief Delivered by Hallie Flanagan, Director, Federal Theatre Project, Works Progress Administration, before the Committee on Patents, House of Representatives: Washington, DC February 8, 1938" (Works Progress Administration, 1938) online.

External links 
 Hallie Flanagan papers, 1923–1963, held by the Billy Rose Theatre Division, New York Public Library for the Performing Arts
 Hallie Davis Flanagan papers, held by Smith College Special Collections 
 Library of Congress – Can You Hear Their Voices? (1931)
 Bio of Hallie Flanagan from a site on the Federal Theatre Project
 Vassar Encyclopedia entry for Hallie Flanagan Davis
 Hallie Flanagan entry on WomenArts.org

1880s births
1969 deaths
People from Redfield, South Dakota
American theatre managers and producers
Harvard University alumni
Grinnell College alumni
Smith College faculty
Vassar College faculty
Writers from Iowa
Writers from Massachusetts
Writers from South Dakota
20th-century American dramatists and playwrights
Federal Theatre Project administrators
American women dramatists and playwrights
20th-century American women writers
American women academics